The Bridgeport & Port Jefferson Steamboat Company, commonly referred to as the Bridgeport & Port Jefferson Ferry is a ferry company that operates ferry service across Long Island Sound, between the city of Bridgeport, Connecticut and the Long Island village of Port Jefferson, New York.  Founded in 1883, it is one of the oldest continuously-operating ferry companies in the United States.

Service
The Bridgeport & Port Jefferson Ferry operates between Port Jefferson, NY and Bridgeport, CT, and the service currently consists of three vessels and two terminals. Each vessel contains a dual-level car deck with capacity ranging from 85 to 120, with capacity often selling out on summer weekends. Onboard amenities include a bar (branded the Steamboat Lounge), food service, restrooms, and both indoor and outdoor seating.

Travel time across Long Island Sound is approximately 1 hour and 15 minutes.

History
The first ferry service began in 1872 and proved popular.
The Bridgeport & Port Jefferson Steamboat Company was subsequently founded in 1883 by several backers, including entrepreneur  P.T. Barnum, and Port Jefferson seaman Charles E. Tooker. The ferry company originally operated steamship service, but the acquisition of the Martha's Vineyard in 1968 ended steamship service. Since then, the company has been referred to in signage and conversation as the Bridgeport & Port Jefferson Ferry, but the term Steamboat Company is still used legally.

Since 1980, the President has been Brian McAllister who also owns one hundred percent of the company's shares. The McAllisters purchased the company in 1960 from Joseph Tooker, Charles Tooker's grandson.

During the 1980s, the ferry company offered year-round service for the first time in company's history. The entrances of the Grand Republic (not to be confused with the current Grand Republic, built in 2003) and the Park City into service in 1983 and 1986, respectively, were each met with skyrocketing ridership.

In 1999, with the entrance of the PT Barnum into service, the ferry company began operating hourly, three-vessel service on weekends, holidays, and during the summer. The ferry company still operates only two vessels on off-season weekdays, with departures every 90 minutes. A new Grand Republic entered service in 2003, while the old one was sold to Cross Sound Ferry and renamed the Mary Ellen.

On May 29, 2009, the United States Court of Appeals for the Second Circuit upheld a United States District Court for the District of Connecticut ruling that the Bridgeport Port Authority was unconstitutionally collecting taxes from the ferry company and passengers and using the tax money for purposes other than for the benefit of the ferry company and passengers. The port authority was ordered to pay the ferry company $1.1 million in damages.

In 2013, the ferry company unveiled plans to move its Bridgeport dock across Bridgeport Harbor to a new and larger terminal on Seaview Avenue at the former site of Turbana Corporation. The city approved the plan in April 2014, and the new terminal was slated to open in 2020, however due to delays owing to environmental and legal issues, construction on the new terminal has yet to commence as of 2021.  

In June 2016, the Bridgeport & Port Jefferson Ferry made significant changes to its ticketing system. Tickets were for many years purchased while on board the vessel (at a purser's booth) and turned in to a crew member before walking or driving off. However, in June 2016, the new ticket system was implemented, where tickets are purchased and turned in before boarding the vessel. Tickets are sold online, over the phone, and inside the terminals. The new tickets contain bar codes, which are scanned prior to boarding, and can also be displayed over a cell phone or mobile device.

As of 2017, the Bridgeport & Port Jefferson Ferry carries approximately 1.3 million passengers and 500,000 vehicles annually.

Ports
The average crossing is one hour and fifteen minutes in duration.

Bridgeport
The ferry is located at 330 Water Street on the western bank of Bridgeport Harbor.  It is within walking distance of the Arena at Harbor Yard, the Ballpark at Harbor Yard, the Barnum Museum, the Metro-North station, the main GBTA Bus Station, the Klein Memorial Auditorium, and most of downtown.  In 2004 a new car loading ramp was installed featuring AASHTO HS-20 truck capacity. The aforementioned proposed new terminal will be located on the opposite side of Bridgeport harbor in Bridgeport’s East End neighborhood off Seaview Avenue at the former site of Turbana Corporation. The ferry company plans to operate either a shuttle or water taxi between the new terminal and downtown.

Port Jefferson
The ferry is located at 102 West Broadway at the head of the harbor.  A large gold leaf statue of an eagle was erected on the corner of East Broadway and NY 25A in 2002, replacing one of Thomas Jefferson.  Directly across from the dock, it is a monument for victims of 9/11. The ferry is approximately one mile north of the Port Jefferson LIRR station.

Current fleet
There are currently three vessels in service. Each vessel is configured similarly, with a dual-level car deck ranging in capacity from 85 to 120. Each vessel has a second deck above the car deck containing a small outdoor area with a handicapped elevator near the back, a large passenger cabin in the middle, with restrooms, seating and a snack bar, and a cocktail lounge (for passengers 21 and over) near the front. A third level contains more outdoor seating, as well as the bridge and helm. All three vessels have elevators from the car deck to the second and third levels, located near the back of each vessel.

MV Park City
The MV Park City was built in 1986 by Offshore Shipbuilding in Palatka, Florida at a cost of $5 million.

During the winter of 2009, the Park City's engines were replaced with two brand-new Tier II Caterpillars to improve reliability and reduce emissions, and during the winter of 2012, she received a $2 million renovation, which included the installation of new onboard elevator and refurbishment of her main cabin; the renovations made the Park City ADA-compliant.

MV P.T. Barnum
The MV PT Barnum was built in 1999 by Eastern Shipbuilding Group Panama City, Florida. She is capable of carrying 120 cars and was constructed at a cost of $12 million.

MV Grand Republic
The MV Grand Republic was built in 2003 by Eastern Shipbuilding Group in Panama City, FL. She is the sister ship to the PT Barnum, with both vessels having been built to near-identical specifications, with only minor mechanical and cosmetic differences between the two vessels. She has capacity for 1000 passengers and 120 cars.

Former fleet
 Grand Republic The name Grand Republic was previously used for an older and slightly smaller vessel built in 1983. It was built in 1983 (The ferry company's centennial) by Offshore Shipbuilding in Palatka, FL, who would also build the MV Park City 3 years later (The two boats were built to similar but not identical specifications). It was 280 feet long and 44 feet wide with capacity for 1000 passengers and 85 cars. It was sold to Cross Sound Ferry in March 2003, who renamed it the Mary Ellen and placed it back in service on their route between New London, Connecticut and Orient, New York that June, where it remains in service as of 2023.
  - Before the (1983) Grand Republic, this steel-hulled, diesel-powered ship ran seasonally (no winter service) with six round trips a day from 1968. It was built in Bath, Maine in 1923, and was previously used by the Woods Hole, Martha's Vineyard, and Nantucket Steamship Authority. It was the first vessel in the company's history that was capable of carrying automobiles, having capacity for 30. It was sold in 1986 to Massachusetts Bay Lines after the MV Park City was built. Massachusetts Bay Lines intended to convert her into a dinner cruise ship, but never did, and the Martha's Vineyard was ultimately scrapped in 1990.
 Catskill - The Catskill was built in 1924 to replace the Nonowantuc, and was the first steel-hulled vessel in the company's history. It was named after the Catskill mountains in upstate New York. It was sold 1968 after the Martha's Vineyard was bought.
 Park City - A previous Park City served from 1898 through 1951. Its name was derived from the city of Bridgeport's nickname. Coal (hard)powered.
 Nonowantuc - The first vessel in the Bridgeport & Port Jefferson Ferry's history, serving from 1883 to 1924. It was slightly smaller than the 1898 Park City, but also featured masts if the boilers failed.

Gallery

References

External links
 Official website

Transportation in Bridgeport, Connecticut
Ferries of Connecticut
Ferries of New York (state)
Port Jefferson, New York
Transportation in Fairfield County, Connecticut
Transportation in Suffolk County, New York
Long Island Sound